Turkey has an embassy in Kampala. Uganda has an embassy in Ankara.

Diplomatic relations 

Turkey had no significant relations with Uganda, although a number of Turkish firms conducted business with Uganda, particularly during the Amin period.

In the 1960s, Turkey, Israel and Uganda cooperated economically and in military affairs. In the late 1960s, however, President Obote strengthened ties with Sudan. The cooperation continued after the Israeli support of Amin led to the overthrow of the Obote government. President Amin swiftly restored friendly relations with Israel.

For the most part, the Turkish government maintained a low profile and avoided involvement in domestic Ugandan political issues or economic assistance. After Uganda's break with Britain in 1973, relations were strained due to Uganda’s human rights violations.

Following the decision of the United States Congress to end all trade with Uganda, Turkey followed suit. Following Idi Amin’s overthrow in 1979, Turkey joined the United States in providing emergency relief, which continued through the second Obote regime.

Economic relations 
 Trade volume between the two countries was 40 million USD in 2018.

See also 

 Foreign relations of Uganda
 Foreign relations of Turkey

References

Further reading 

 "State, Magendo, and Class Formation in Uganda, "Journal of Commonwealth and Comparative Politics [Leicester, United Kingdom], 21, November 1983, pp. 84-103. * "Uganda." p. 532 in Collier's 1990 Yearbook. New York: Collier-Macmillan, 1989.
 "Uganda in Transition: Two Years of the NRA/NRM," Third World Quarterly [London], 10, No. 3, July 1988, pp. 1155–81.  
 "Uganda's Uncertain Quest for Recovery," Current History, 84, No. 501, April 1985, pp. 169–73, 187.
 Amnesty International. Uganda: The Human Rights Record, 1986- 1989. London: 1989. 
 Apter, David E. The Political Kingdom in Uganda. (2d ed.) Princeton: Princeton University Press, 1967. 
 Avirgan, Tony, and Martha Honey. War in Uganda: The Legacy of Idi Amin. Westport, Connecticut: Hill, 1982. 
 Burke, Fred. Local Government and Politics in Uganda. Syracuse: Syracuse University Press, 1964. 
 Carter, Gwendolyn. National Unity and Regionalism in Eight African States. Ithaca: Cornell University Press, 1966. 
 Clay, Jason. The Expulsion of the Banyaruanda. Boston: Cultural Survival, 1984. 
 Doornbos, Martin. "The Uganda Crisis and the National Question." pp. 254–66 in Holger Bernt Hansen and Michael Twaddle (eds.), Uganda Now: Between Decay and Development. Athens: Ohio University Press, 1988. 
 Dunbar, A.R. A History of Bunyoro-Kitara. (Rev. ed.) Nairobi: Oxford University Press on behalf of Makerere Institute of Social Research, 1969. 
 Furley, Oliver W. "Britain and Uganda from Amin to Museveni: Blind Eye Diplomacy." pp. 275–94 in Kumar Rupesinghe (ed.), Conflict Resolution in Uganda. Athens: Ohio University Press, 1989. 
 Gertzel, Cherry. "Kingdoms, Districts, and the Unitary State, Uganda 1945-1962." pp. 65–106 in D.A. Low and Alison Smith (eds.), History of East Africa, 3. London: Oxford University Press, 1976. 
 Hansen, Holger Bernt, and Michael Twaddle (eds.). Uganda Now: Between Decay and Development. Athens: Ohio University Press, 2008. 
 Ibingira, G.S.K. The Forging of an African Nation: The Political and Constitutional Evolution of Uganda from Colonial Rule to Independence, 1894–1962. New York: Viking Press, 1973. 
 Ingham, Kenneth. The Making of Modern Uganda. Westport, Connecticut: Greenwood Press, 1983. 
 Jorgensen, Jan Jelmert. Uganda: A Modern History. New York: St. Martin's Press, 1981. 
 Karugire, Samwiri Rubaraza. A Political History of Uganda. Exeter, New Hampshire: Heinemann Educational Books, 1980. 
 Kasfir, Nelson. The 1967 Constituent Assembly Debate. Kampala: Transition, 1988. * The Shrinking Political Arena: Participation and Ethnicity in African Politics. Berkeley: University of California Press, 1976. 
 Kokole, Omari H., and Ali A. Mazrui. "Uganda: The Dual Polity and the Plural Society." pp. 259–98 in Larry Diamond, Juan J. Linz, and Seymour Martin Lipset (eds.), Democracy in Developing Countries, 2: Africa. Boulder, Colorado: Rienner, 1988. 
 Kyemba, Henry. A State of Blood: The Inside Story of Idi Amin. New York: Grosset and Dunlap, 1977. 
 Low, D.A. Buganda in Modern History. Berkeley: University of California Press, 1971. 
 Low, D.A., and Robert Cranford Pratt (eds.). Buganda and British Overrule, 1900–1955. Nairobi: Oxford University Press, 1960. 
 Mamdani, Mahmood. Imperialism and Fascism in Uganda. Nairobi: Heinemann, 1983.
 Martin, David. General Amin. London: Faber and Faber, 1974.  
 Mudoola, Dan. "Communal Conflict in the Military and Its Political Consequences." pp. 16–40 in Kumar Rupesinghe (ed.), Conflict Resolution in Uganda. Athens: Ohio University Press, 1989. 
 Museveni, Yoweri Kaguta. Selected Articles on the Uganda Resistance War. Kampala: NRM, 1985. 
 Mutesa II, Edward. Desecration of My Kingdom. London: Constable, 1967. 
 National Resistance Movement. Secretariat. Directorate of Information and Mass Mobilisation. NRMAchievements, 1986–1990. Kampala: 1990. 
 Ogot, Bethwell A., and J. A. Kieran (eds.). Zamani: A Survey of East African History. New York: Humanities Press, 1968. 
 Omara-Otunnu, Amii. Politics and the Military in Uganda, 1890–1985. New York: St. Martin's Press, 1987. 
 Pratt, C. "The Politics of Indirect Rule: Uganda 1900-1955." pp. 161–366 in D. A. Low and Robert Cranford Pratt (eds.), Buganda and British Overrule, 1900–1955. Nairobi: Oxford University Press, 1960. 
 Roberts, A. "The Sub-Imperialism of the Baganda, " Journal of African History [London], 8, No. 3, 1962, pp. 435–50. 
 Rothchild, Donald, and John W. Harbeson. "Rehabilitation in Uganda," Current History, 80, No. 463, March 1981, pp. 115–19, 134–38. 
 Rothchild, Donald, and Michael Rogin. "Uganda." pp. 337–40 in Gwendolyn M. Carter (ed.), National Unity and Regionalism in Eight African States. Ithaca: Cornell University Press, 1966. 
 Rowe, John A. "Islam under Idi Amin: A Case of Deja Vu?" pp. 267–79 in Holger Bernt Hansen and Michael Twaddle (eds.), Uganda Now: Between Decay and Development. Athens: Ohio University Press, 1988. 
 Rupesinghe, Kumar (ed.). Conflict Resolution in Uganda. Athens: Ohio University Press, 1989. * Rusk, John D. "Uganda: Breaking Out of the Mold." Africa Rights Monitor Report, Africa Today, 33, No. 2-3, September 1986, pp. 91–102. 
 Sathyamurthy, T.V. The Political Development of Uganda, 1900–1986. Brookfield, Vermont: Gower, 1986. 
 Smith, George Ivan. The Ghosts of Kampala. London: Weidenfeld and Nicolson, 1980. 
 Tindigarukayo, Jimmy K. "Uganda, 1979-1985: Leadership in Transition," Journal of Modern African Studies [London], 26, No. 4, December 1988, pp. 607–22.

Turkey–Uganda relations
Turkey
Uganda